Yuri Albertovich Rozanov (12 June 1961 – 3 March 2021) was a Russian sports TV commentator, mainly working on broadcasts of football and ice hockey matches. Together with Sergey Crabu, they were awarded the TEFI in the category   sports commentator / presenter of the sports program   in 2012.

Biography
Rozanov studied at the secondary school № 1 in Vidnoye, Moscow Oblast. He also studied at the Moscow Power Engineering Institute, at the Faculty of Electronic Engineering, but did not graduate.

Rozanov started his career on the channel NTV Plus. He was head of the Editorial Board.

On 1 September 2012, Rozanov became a commentator on Ukrainian channels. He left Ukraine in April 2014 due to the political situation in the country.

Between November 2015 and his death, Rozanov was a commentator of football and hockey broadcasts on Match TV.

Rozanov was married and had one daughter.

He died on 3 March 2021 from cancer. He is buried at Mitinskoe Cemetery.

References

External links
 Интервью Розанова Sports.ru
 Интервью Розанова Ntvplus.ru
 Конференция Юрия Розанова на Sports.ru

1961 births
2021 deaths
Deaths from cancer in Russia
People from Sergiyev Posad
Russian association football commentators
Russian radio personalities
Russian sports journalists
Russian television journalists
Deaths from lung cancer